Nathuram Sharma (1859–1932), better known by his pen-name Mahakavi Shankar, was a Hindi and Urdu poet from Harduaganj, Aligarh, North-Western Provinces (now Uttar Pradesh), British India. He worked with the Irrigation Department at Kanpur and subsequently as an Ayurvedic physician. His poetic works are primarily in the dialects of Braj Bhasha and Khariboli. He was a writer of Modern Period.

Early life
Shankar was born in 1859 in Harduaganj, Aligarh, North-Western Provinces (now Uttar Pradesh), British India, and received his early education at the local primary school. In 1874, when he was a student of the Middle Class, English Educational Inspector E. T. Constable inspected the school. Constable was impressed with his talent and knowledge and commented in the inspection book: "Nathuram is an intelligent student, full of promise."

Shankar knew Sanskrit and Persian as well as Hindi and Urdu. He was a contributor to Saraswati, the literary journal of Mahavir Prasad Dwivedi.

Poetic works
Shankar's poetic works include: Anurag ratna, Shankar saroj, Garbhranda rahasya, Gitavali, Kavita kunj, Doha, Samasyapurtiyan, Vividh rachnayen, Kalit kalewar and Shankar Satsai.  Influenced by the Arya Samaj movement, he was a social reformer who used his mastery of language effectively to this purpose.

He was referred to as Mahakavi meaning Great Poet.

Death
Shankar died on 21 August 1932 at Harduaganj, Aligarh, North-Western Provinces, British India.

Lineage
Shankar was the father of Hindi poet Hari Shankar Sharma, grandfather of Hindi poet and writer Kripa Shankar Sharma and great-grandfather of Hindi poet Indira Indu.

References

Further reading
History of Indian Literature: 1911–1956, Struggle for freedom: triumph and tragedy, Sisir Kumar Das (ed.), Sahitya Akademi: New Delhi (1995), p. 199,  
Mahakavi shankara Smratiai Grantha which -Published by Mahakavi Sankar Smarka Samiti, Harduaganj (Aligarh), in 1986.
Nathurama Sharma Shankar ki kavya-sadhana by Vasanti Salavekara & Published by-Vinaya Prakashan in 1994
Vaidik Geetanjali by Deshraj Singh & Published by- Mahakavi Sankar Smarka Samiti, Harduaganj (Aligarh)in 2013

External links
 BrandBihar.com poem in Hindi.
 Nathuram Shankar Sharma"Shankar" at KavitKosh
 
 Nathuram Shankar Sharma "Shankar" at Hindi Sathiya.org

1859 births
1932 deaths
People from Aligarh
Hindi-language poets
Hindi-language writers
Arya Samajis